Clubs from Bosnia and Herzegovina have played in European competitions since the 1967–68 season, when Yugoslav champions Sarajevo took part in the European Cup. They defeated Cypriot team Olympiakos Nicosia in the first round and then lost to Manchester United in the second round.

Beside FK Sarajevo, four more teams from Bosnia and Herzegovina played in European competitions during country being part of Yugoslavia with FK Željezničar Sarajevo being the best of them, reaching 1984–85 UEFA Cup semi-finals where they lost to Hungarian side Videoton 4–3 on aggregate. In the post-war Bosnia and Herzegovina, ten more clubs played in European competitions with none making the group stages.

Qualification to European competitions
Four teams from Bosnia and Herzegovina qualify to European competitions.

Premier League champions qualify to UEFA Champions League, while three other teams (one being the national Cup winner) qualify to UEFA Europa League. Champions League teams start in the second qualifying round while teams in Europa League start in first or second qualifying round. As of 2018–19, no teams from Bosnia and Herzegovina played in group stage of both European competitions.

UEFA country coefficient
At the end of the 2021–22 season, Bosnia and Herzegovina was placed 35th. The list below shows coefficients of Bosnia and Herzegovina, its predecessor and successor and countries from former Yugoslavia.

Ranking records
 Record-high ranking: 29 out of 53 after 2000–11 season
 Record-low ranking: 49 out of 50 after 1999–00 season

Pre-war period
Total of five teams from Bosnia and Herzegovina played in three major European competitions - then Champions Cup, then Fairs Cup/UEFA Cup and abolished Cup Winners Cup.

European Cup
Two teams took part in premier European competition. Sarajevo was the only team to win and qualify to next round - it was in their debut season that ended in second round against Manchester United. Next and their last participation was disastrous loss to Finnish champion Kuusysi Lahti. Sarajevo's fierce city rival, Željezničar lost to English team Derby County in their only participation in this competition.

Cup Winners' Cup
This competition, abolished in 1999, saw two teams from Bosnia and Herzegovina taking part. Both Velež Mostar and Borac Banja Luka appeared on two occasions.

Inter-cities Fairs Cup
Željezničar was the only club from Bosnia and Herzegovina to appear in this competition. It was in its last season (1970–71) before competition got sanctioned by UEFA and changed name to UEFA Cup. Željezničar lost in first round against Belgian powerhouse Anderlecht.

UEFA Cup
In 1971–72 season UEFA Cup was introduced. Teams from Bosnia and Herzegovina played much more games in Europe than before, and most notable campaign was Željezničar's run to semifinal in 1984–85 season. They lost to Hungarian side Videoton. Velež played in four seasons, Sarajevo and Željezničar in two and Sloboda Tuzla in one season.

Statistics

Records
Biggest win
1975-76 Cup Winners' Cup
Borac Banja Luka -  Rumelange 9-0

Biggest aggregate win
1975-76 Cup Winners' Cup
Borac Banja Luka -  Rumelange 14-1 (9-0 H, 5-1 A)

Biggest loss
1982-83 UEFA Cup
 Anderlecht - Sarajevo 6-1

Biggest aggregate loss
1982-83 UEFA Cup
Sarajevo -  Anderlecht 2-6 (1-6 A, 1-0 H)

Furthest in a competition
1984-85 UEFA Cup
Željezničar Sarajevo in semifinal

Post-war period
After break up of Yugoslavia, Bosnia and Herzegovina, like other new countries, started its own football league. But, inclusion in UEFA competitions came in 1999, when Jedinstvo Bihać took part in (now abolished) UEFA Intertoto Cup. First Champions League appearance came in 2000, when Brotnjo Čitluk took part after winning Bosniak-Croatian playoff. Two years earlier two teams from Sarajevo played in UEFA Cup, while there were no teams in European competitions in 1999–00 season.

Champions League
Eight teams from Bosnia and Herzegovina played in Champions League since 2000–01 season. No teams managed to qualify to group stage, while two teams managed to qualify to last qualifying round where they suffered heavy defeats.

In 2002–03 season Željezničar defeated Icelandic and Norwegian champions and faced English side Newcastle in third qualifying round. Guests won 0–1 in Sarajevo while in England Newcastle won 4–0. In 2007–08 season Sarajevo, after trashing Maltese champion, shocked Belgian vice-champion Genk and earned third qualifying round match against Ukrainian giants Dynamo Kyiv. Ukrainians won in both games.

Other teams that played in Champions League were Brotnjo (once), Zrinjski Mostar and Široki Brijeg twice, Borac Banja Luka, Modriča and Leotar Trebinje once.

UEFA Cup / Europa League
Just like in Champions League, no teams from Bosnia and Herzegovina reached group stage. Best results were qualification to first round, which was achieved twice from both Sarajevo clubs and Široki Brijeg. No other team played in Europe in September or later. Sarajevo came closest to group stage qualification, losing to Romanian side Cluj in play-off round (fourth qualifying round) in 2009–10 season.

UEFA Intertoto Cup
In third level European competition, active from 1995 to 2008, six teams represented Bosnia and Herzegovina. In 1999, Jedinstvo Bihać was the first team from post-war Bosnia and Herzegovina to play in European competition, first team to win and first team to progress to next round of competition. No team progressed further than second round, meaning no team played more than four games in a single season.

Statistics

Records
Biggest win
2010–11 UEFA Europa League
 Tre Penne - Zrinjski Mostar 2-9

Biggest aggregate win
2010–11 UEFA Europa League
Zrinjski Mostar -  Tre Penne 13-3 (9-2 A, 4-1 H)

Biggest loss
2018–19 UEFA Europa League
Sarajevo -  Atalanta 0-8

Biggest aggregate loss
2007–08 UEFA CUP
Zrinjski Mostar -  Partizan 1-11 (1-6 H, 0-5 A) (match declared void due to Serbian fans' riots, Zrinjski progressed to the next round.)

Results by competition

European Cup/Champions League

SFR Yugoslavia era (1955–1992)

Bosnia and Herzegovina era (1992–present)

UEFA Cup/Europa League

SFR Yugoslavia era (1971–1992)

Bosnia and Herzegovina era (1992–present)

1 Bashkimi were awarded a 3–0 win because was Žepče fielded an ineligible player.
2 UEFA expelled Partizan from the 2007–08 UEFA Cup due to crowd trouble at their away tie in Mostar, which forced the match to be interrupted for 10 minutes. UEFA adjudged travelling Partizan fans to have been the culprits of the trouble, but Partizan were allowed to play the return leg while the appeal was being processed. However, Partizan's appeal was rejected so Zrinjski Mostar qualified.

Europa Conference League

Bosnia and Herzegovina era (2021–present)

Cup Winners' Cup

SFR Yugoslavia era (1960–1992)

Inter-Cities Fairs Cup

SFR Yugoslavia era (1955–1971)

Intertoto Cup

Bosnia and Herzegovina era (1995–2008)

See also

FK Sarajevo in European football
FK Željezničar Sarajevo in European football

References

Football in Bosnia and Herzegovina
European football clubs in international competitions